The Palestinian Football Association is the governing body for football in Palestine, and for the men's Palestine national football team and the Palestine women's national football team. The federation dates back to 1928. The Arabs of Palestine established a separate federation to represent them.

History

Palestinian Jewish formation
The Mandatory Palestine Football Federation was founded in 1928 by Jews living in the British Mandate of Palestine. Its national team, Mandatory Palestine national football team, participated in qualifying rounds for the 1934 Football World Cup and 1938 FIFA World Cup. In 1948 it changed its name to Israel Football Association.

Palestinian Arab formation 
A Palestine Football Association representing the Palestinian Arabs was formed in 1962 and has been a member of the Union of Arab Football Associations since that was formed in 1974.

Palestinian Authority
It was accepted as a member by FIFA in 1998, after the creation of the Palestinian Authority. The PFA has also been a member of the Asian Football Confederation (AFC) since 1998, in the West Asian Football Federation.

On 11 February 2011, the PFA formed the first women's league.

Divisions 

The football division system is parted into two: the West Bank and Gaza Strip. There is a men's West Bank Premier League and a men's Gaza Strip League as well as a West Bank Women's League. Each league has 12 clubs.

Management 
 President: General Jibril Rajoub
 First Vice-president: Ibrahim Abu Saleem
 Vice-president: Susan Shalabi, Ziab El Khatib
 General Secretary: Omar Abu Hashia

See also
West Bank Premier League
Gaza Strip Premier League
West Bank First League
Gaza Strip First League
Palestine Cup

References

External links
Official website (in Arabic)
Palestine at AFC site
Palestine at the FIFA website

Football in the State of Palestine
Palestine
Football
Sports organizations established in 1962